The Lagoa do Jequiá Marine Extractive Reserve ( is a coastal marine extractive reserve in the state of Alagoas, Brazil.

Location

The Lagoa do Jequiá Marine Extractive Reserve is in the municipality of Jequiá da Praia, and includes an area of sea offshore from this municipality and Coruripe and São Miguel dos Campos in Alagoas.
The reserve includes the Jequiá Lagoon, where the Jequiá River spreads out in the coastal plain just before it flows into the Atlantic Ocean.
It protects the river down to its mouth, and then covers a rectangular area of the ocean that extends along the coast in the northeast direction.

The population in 2002 was about 2,000 people.
They were mainly engaged in fishing and collecting crustaceans near the mangroves.
Most of them have an incomplete primary education.
The population generally has poor health due to deficient sanitation.

History

The Lagoa do Jequiá Marine Extractive Reserve was created by federal decree on 27 September 2001.
It is administered by the Chico Mendes Institute for Biodiversity Conservation (ICMBio).
It is classed as IUCN protected area category VI (protected area with sustainable use of natural resources).
An extractive reserve is an area used by traditional extractive populations whose livelihood is based on extraction, subsistence agriculture and small-scale animal raising.
Its basic objectives are to protect the livelihoods and culture of these people and to ensure sustainable use of natural resources.

On 20 December 2007 the Instituto Nacional de Colonização e Reforma Agrária (INCRA: National Institute for Colonization and Agrarian Reform)  recognised the reserve as meeting the needs of 3,000 families, who would qualify for PRONAF support.
The deliberative council was created on 5 September 2011.
On 18 July 2014 the profile of families benefiting from the reserve was approved.

Notes

Sources

Protected areas of Alagoas
Marine extractive reserves of Brazil
Protected areas established in 2001
2001 establishments in Brazil